Acantholimon libanoticum (Lebanese prickly thrift, غملول لبناني) is a plant in the family Plumbaginaceae first described by Pierre Edmond Boissier. It is native to Western Asia from Turkey to Syria and Lebanon.

Description
Acantholimon libanoticum is evergreen. The simple leaves are alternate. They are acicular with entire margins. It flowers from July to August.

References

libanoticum
Flora of Lebanon and Syria
Flora of Palestine (region)
Flora of Turkey
Taxa named by Pierre Edmond Boissier